The Human Rights League was founded in Belgium on 8 May 1901, after the in 1898 established  in France.

In the First World War, the organisation was dissolved. In the 1930s, its president Emile Vandervelde emphasized on concerting with both the International Federation for Human Rights (FIDH) at Paris and the government at Brussels.

The Nazi-German invaders put a halt to the organization's activities and ceased its archives in 1940. The German Occupation and the following repression claimed their toll in absence of a Belgian human rights organisation.

In 1978 as a practical internal reorganisation of the 'Institution', and since 1982 also officially, the national organisation was split into the Dutch-speaking Liga voor Mensenrechten and the French-speaking Ligue des droits de l'homme.
 The Dutch name still registered with the International Federation of Human Rights Leagues, shows an obsolete spelling and is no longer used: . This FIDH does however show the correct Dutch name in the contact information.
 The French name is identical to the one for the similar organisation in France, see Human Rights League (France). The International Federation of Human Rights Leagues (FIDH) shows LDH and LDHB as abbreviation for the French-speaking organisation in Belgium, which since 1992 is also associated with the European League for Human Rights, abbreviated AEDH from its French name Association Européenne pour la défense des Droits de l'Homme. The latter's web site however, shows LDH as abbreviation for both organisations.

References

External links
 Liga voor Mensenrechten see 'Voorgeschiedenis', web site Liga voor Mensenrechtsn (web retrieval 23 February 2010)
 FIDH - 155 organisations de défense des droits de l'Homme à travers le monde the International Federation of Human Rights Leagues's list of 155 organisations worldwide (web retrieval 22 February 2010)
 AEDH member leagues (web retrieval 22 February 2010)

Human rights organisations based in Belgium